Almensilla is a municipality in Seville, Spain. In 2005 it had a population of 4,534. It has an area of 14 km² and a population density of 324. It is at an altitude of 45 meters and is located 15 kilometers from Seville.

In 2010 the municipality of Almensilla held the highest debt of all municipalities in Spain, reaching more than 800% of the declared yearly income.

References

Municipalities of the Province of Seville